Modrzejewski (feminine Modrzejewska) is a Polish surname. Notable people include:

 Helena Modrzejewska (1840-1909), Polish actress
 Joseph Mélèze-Modrzejewski (1930-2017), Polish-French historian
 Robert J. Modrzejewski (born 1934), American military officer
 Rudolf Modrzejewski (1861-1940), Polish-American civil engineer

Polish-language surnames